Tiny Monroe were an English indie pop band of the 1990s.

History
The band was formed in London in 1993 by founder members Norma Jean "NJ" Wilow (vocals), Alex Culpin (bass guitar), Philip Spalding (guitar) and Greg Sanford (drums).  The line up was cemented when Richard Davies (guitar) and Jon Solomon (drums) replaced Spalding and Sanford. This was the line up that played at Glastonbury, Reading and T in the Park festivals in 1994, and who recorded the majority of the songs on the album 'Volcanoes'.  A final line up appeared post recording of the band's only album 'Volcanoes' comprising NJ Wilow (vocals), Richard Davies (guitar), Garry Becker (bass) and Dan Neumann (drums). The band quickly attracted press attention from the NME and Melody Maker. The band emerged as part of a perceived wave of female fronted bands influenced by the new wave sounds of the late 70s and early 80s. Other bands to emerge at the same time included Elastica, Sleeper, Echobelly and Salad.

The band released their debut single "VHF855V" (the tile coming from the number plate of NJ's Ford Escort) on their manager Howard Gough's Laurel record label in March 1994, and released their first album Volcanoes in July 1996. Their most successful release, the Cream EP reached number 7 in the national indie chart in April 1994, and number 100 in the UK Singles Chart.

Early support tours with Cranes and Curve were followed by festival appearances at Glastonbury, Reading and T In The Park in 1994. Other festival appearances included Sweden's Hultsfred Festival and France's RouteRock festival in St. Malo. The band undertook several headline tours and supported the Pretenders, Suede and Radiohead at the invitation of all three groups.

While in the band, NJ played the role of an alien in the BBC television film The Traveller.

Discography

Album 
 Volcanoes LP (1996), Laurel

"She"
"Cream Bun"
"Love Of the bottle"
"Open Invitation"
"Snake In The Grass"
"VHF 855V"
"Brittle Bones"
"Secret Place"
"Skin Beach"
"Women In Love"
"Bubble"

Singles 
 "VHF 855V" (1994), Laurel
 Cream EP (1. Cream Bun 2. Jealousy 3. Brittle Bones 4. Sonic Blue) (1994), Laurel
 "She" (1. She 2. The Party's Over 3. Really Happy) (1996), Laurel
 "Open Invitation" (1. Open Invitation 2. Another Station 3. Mirror) (1996), Laurel

References

External links 
 Norma Wilow website

British indie pop groups
English indie rock groups